...And Don't the Kids Just Love It is the debut album by English post-punk band Television Personalities, released in January 1981 by Rough Trade Records. It was recorded in 1980 by the lineup of Dan Treacy, Ed Ball, and Mark Sheppard. The album marked the band members' first full-length work, following several singles recorded with various associated projects, including 'O' Level and Teenage Filmstars.

The album's cover features a photograph of model, actress, and singer Twiggy with actor Patrick Macnee, best known for his role in the British television series The Avengers.

Fire Records reissued the album in 1990 and 2009 in the United Kingdom, while Razor & Tie reissued it in 1995 in the United States. In 2002, Pitchfork listed ...And Don't the Kids Just Love It as the 64th best album of the 1980s.

Track listing

Personnel
Credits are adapted from the album's liner notes.

Television Personalities
 Dan Treacy
 Ed Ball
 Mark Sheppard

The sleeve notes assign a fictitious production credit to "Vic Hammersmith-Broadway", a reference to producer Vic Coppersmith-Heaven. The album was in fact produced by the band.

Charts

References

1981 debut albums
Television Personalities albums
Rough Trade Records albums
Fire Records (UK) albums
Razor & Tie albums